Adam Maurice Reed (born 18 February 1975) is an English former footballer who played in the Football League as a defender for Darlington, where he started and ended his career, and for Rochdale. During his first spell at Darlington he was voted both the supporters' and players' player of the season in 1994–95. A close season move to Blackburn Rovers for a fee of £200,000 followed when he became their first signing since they were crowned Premier League champions. During his three years at Ewood Park his only first team appearance was on the bench as a substitute in a League cup game at Preston. He had loan spells at Darlington and Rochdale before returning to Darlington permanently. After being released at the end of the 2003 season he spent a season at Whitby Town prior to his retirement.

He works at Middlesbrough FC as a physiotherapist.

References

External links
 

1975 births
Living people
Sportspeople from Bishop Auckland
Footballers from County Durham
English footballers
Association football defenders
Darlington F.C. players
Blackburn Rovers F.C. players
Rochdale A.F.C. players
Whitby Town F.C. players
English Football League players